Pizhma is the name of several places in Russia:

Urban localities
Pizhma, Nizhny Novgorod Oblast, a work settlement in Tonshayevsky District of Nizhny Novgorod Oblast

Rural localities
Pizhma, Leningrad Oblast, a village in Kobrinskoye Settlement Municipal Formation of Gatchinsky District of Leningrad Oblast
Pizhma, Mari El Republic, a village in Pizhmensky Rural Okrug of Medvedevsky District of the Mari El Republic

Rivers
Pizhma (Pechora), a tributary of the Pechora in Komi Republic
Pizhma (Vyatka), a tributary of the Vyatka in Nizhny Novgorod and Kirov Oblasts